A partial lunar eclipse took place on Monday, February 11, 1952.

Visibility

Related lunar eclipses

Lunar year series

See also
List of lunar eclipses
List of 20th-century lunar eclipses

Notes

External links

1952-02
1952 in science
February 1952 events